Tourism in the United Arab Emirates is an important component of the Emirati economy, and consists of domestic and international components. In 2018, tourist industry composed over 164.7 billion dirham to country's GDP.

The tourist industry of the United Arab Emirates is the most successful among the Gulf nations, and have long enjoyed status as the leading tourist nation of the GCC. The country is also the major tourist force in the Arab world. Tourism employed more than 604,300 people for the United Arab Emirates as for 2018. It is expected to continue expanding, with the revenue increased 12,4% of the country's GDP in 2027, and will employ more 410,000 people to the industry. Effort to Emiratize the industry has been ongoing, which is considered crucial for the development of the country's tourism.

The country's major tourist attraction includes the famous Burj Khalifa in Dubai, the tallest tower in the world; The World archipelago and Palm Jumeirah also in Dubai; Sheikh Zayed Mosque and Yas Marina Circuit in Abu Dhabi; Al Hajar Mountains in Fujairah. The uniqueness of the country's natural desert life, especially with the Bedouins, also facilitates the country's tourist industry.

History 
When the country was first formed in 1971 and freed from British control, the country itself did not have any sufficient tourist industry and the economic situation of the newly established nation was weak, despite massive oil wealth. Realizing the need to develop the country, and the awareness of oil limits, Sheikh Zayed bin Sultan Al Nahyan, who initiated the foundation of the UAE, envisioned the plan to diversify the country's economy, in which tourism was specifically regarded. The envision was eventually carried out, and in 1979, Sheikh Zayed opened the country's first-ever hotel, the Metropolitan Hotel Dubai located in Dubai. 

The development of tourism in the United Arab Emirates was heavily linked to the development of tourism in Dubai, which was one of the earliest emirates in the country to open for tourists. Sheikh Rashid bin Saeed Al Maktoum, ruler of Dubai from 1958 till 1990, realised one day Dubai would run out of oil and started building an economy that would outlast it. Sheikh Rashid, together with Sheikh Zayed, was the instrumental leaders of leading the country's tourism, having made a joint declaration for the founding of the Emirates. In 1989 the Dubai Commerce and Tourism Promotion Board was established, to promote Dubai as a luxury destination for the up-tier market and influential business sectors. In January 1997, it was replaced with the Department of Tourism and Commerce Marketing (DTCM). 

Since 2000s, the United Arab Emirates have experienced a significant tourist boom, and increasing life standard and quality made the expenditure on tourism to rise, thus making it more important to the national economy.

Tourist destinations

Abu Dhabi 

Abu Dhabi is the capital of the United Arab Emirates, and is the second most popular tourist destination in the country, under the management of Abu Dhabi Tourism Authority. This is also the center of Formula One race in the country, the Yas Marina Circuit. Nonetheless, the city is also famous for its landscapes, given its proximity to the Persian Gulf. There are over ten beaches functioning in the city serving for tourist purpose. The city is popular for its nightlife, more so than the more populous Dubai as it has lesser restriction and regular laws.

Dubai 

Dubai is the most visited city in the United Arab Emirates, the most expensive city in the GCC and one of the most expensive cities in the world. It is also the home of the two tallest towers in the world, the Burj Al Arab and Burj Khalifa, the latter occupies the top position. Nightlife in the city is also widely promoted. The city is often seen as a symbol of rapid tourist success in the nation. Its richness encompassed by the rapid development and the mix with the local Arab culture made it a popular destination for tourists to travel. However, lack of general tourism development remains an obstacle which the Emirati authorities have sought to tackle.

Fujairah 
Fujairah shares the Al-Hajar Mountains with Ras Al Khaimah, a major tourist attraction in the country. Outside the Hajar Mountains, the Fujairah Fort, Bitnah Fort, Snoopy Island, Masafi and Al-Hayl Castle are also another attractive destinations. Fujairah holds a distinction for having a bull butting culture, a result of Portuguese colonization from 17th century.

Ras Al Khaimah 
Ras Al Khaimah is known for its natural landscape. The Al Hajar Mountains, in particular with mount Jebel Jais, the highest mountain of the country, offers views over craggy peaks down to the coastal plain, making this a common spot for photographers, particularly in the late afternoon when the orange-hued rocks glow. The world's longest zipline is also based in Ras Al Khaimah's Jebel Jais. Other include Dhayah Fort and its beach.

Sharjah 
Sharjah is a major commercial center of the UAE. Sharjah is perhaps, among the most traditional tourist center, due to initiative efforts by the emirate's leadership to keep its spirit within the growing modernization. In 1998, Sharjah was awarded the "Cultural Capital of the Arab World" title by UNESCO representing the United Arab Emirates. Major destinations include the Sharjah Art Museum, Al Noor Mosque, Souk Al Markazi and Sharjah Heritage Area. A cultural heritage project, Heart of Sharjah, has been undertaken to preserve and restore the old town of Sharjah and return it to its 1950s state.

Tourism statistics

International visitors

Concerns 

Although the country has become an increasing tourist power, concerns of human rights' maltreatment and fakeness remain. Ahmed Mansoor, an Emirati human rights activist, has criticized the Emirati authorities for its unlimited tortures, abuse on dissidents and lack of certain support for migrant workers, and warned the situation is deteriorating.

The ongoing exploitation and systematic discrimination of South Asians continue to take place under the kafala system has also met with criticism, notably with Dubai. Some criticism also points against the “soulless” development of the cities in the country, notably Dubai.

In 2020, Kate Hudson had participated in a video advertisement promoting tourism in the United Arab Emirates. Her action was met with criticism from human rights groups.

See also 
 Visa policy of the United Arab Emirates
 List of museums in the United Arab Emirates

References

External links 
 Travel & Tourism – United Arab Emirates Ministry of Foreign Affairs and International Cooperation

Tourism in the United Arab Emirates
United Arab Emirates